The Auckland Gas Company is a company providing gas for residential or commercial customers in the Auckland area, New Zealand. It is one of the oldest still existing brand names in New Zealand, having been established as Auckland Gas Company Ltd in 1862 or 1863. It is owned since 2004 by Nova Energy.

History 
The Auckland Gas Company was formed in 1862 as the first joint stock company in New Zealand. It was also the first private services provider in Auckland. In the 1870s, the company bought and developed a large site in Freemans Bay to build a gasworks (roughly on and east of the site of the current New World supermarket), with further buildings (mainly workshops) and offices on Beaumont Street.

In the late 1960s the Kapuni gas fields were opened, providing natural gas which was cleaner and cheaper than the locally produced coal gas variant, and the company stopped producing gas and became a supplier only. This led to most of the buildings in the Freemans Bay are being demolished.

References 

Oil and gas companies of New Zealand
Companies based in Auckland
Energy companies established in 1862
Todd Corporation